The 1958 CFL season was the inaugural season of the Canadian Football League, although the season structure was essentially identical to that of the previous season conducted under the Canadian Football Council. The Hamilton Tiger-Cats and Winnipeg Blue Bombers met again for Canadian football supremacy. The Blue Bombers turned the tables on the Tiger-Cats this time, winning their first Grey Cup since 1941.

League news
The Canadian Football Council (CFC) withdrew from the Canadian Rugby Union (CRU) to become a separate entity. As a separate entity, the CFC decided to rename its league the Canadian Football League (CFL) on Sunday, January 19, at the Royal Alexandra Hotel in Winnipeg. The CRU deeded the Grey Cup to the newly-minted CFL, officially locking amateur teams out of Grey Cup play. However, the Grey Cup had been the de facto professional football championship of Canada since the Ontario Rugby Football Union withdrew from Grey Cup competition in 1954.

The Commissioner of the CFC, Winnipeg's G. Sydney Halter, QC, was reappointed as the first-ever CFL commissioner. The CFL officially opened its operations on Thursday, August 14, as 18,206 spectators watched the Winnipeg Blue Bombers defeat the Edmonton Eskimos 29–21 at Winnipeg. A regular season game was played in the United States, at Philadelphia's Municipal Stadium on September 14 as the Hamilton Tiger-Cats defeated the Ottawa Rough Riders by a score of 24–18.

Regular season

Final regular season standings
Note: GP = games played, W = wins, L = losses, T = ties, PF = points for, PA = points against, Pts = points

Bold text means a team clinched a playoff berth.
Winnipeg and Hamilton both received first-round byes.

Grey Cup playoffs

Playoff bracket

Division Semi-Finals

 Edmonton won the total-point series 58–12.

Division Finals

Winnipeg won the best-of-three series 2–1.

 Hamilton won the total-point series 54–14.

Grey Cup Championship

Note: Western Semi-Final dates are not confirmed; however, since (1) the regular season ended on November 1 in the West and on November 8 in the East, and (2) all other playoff dates are accurate, including the date of the Grey Cup game, it is reasonable to assume the above dates are correct.

CFL Leaders
 CFL Passing Leaders
 CFL Rushing Leaders
 CFL Receiving Leaders

1958 Eastern All-Stars

Offence
QB – Bernie Faloney, Hamilton Tiger-Cats
RB – Joel Wells, Montreal Alouettes
RB – Gerry McDougall, Hamilton Tiger-Cats
RB – Dick Shatto, Toronto Argonauts
E  – Red O'Quinn, Montreal Alouettes
E  – Paul Dekker, Hamilton Tiger-Cats
FW – Ron Howell, Hamilton Tiger-Cats
C  – Tommy Hugo, Montreal Alouettes
C  – Norm Stoneburgh, Toronto Argonauts
OG – Hardiman Cureton, Ottawa Rough Riders
OG – Jackie Simpson, Montreal Alouettes
OT – Dick Fouts, Toronto Argonauts
OT – John Barrow, Hamilton Tiger-Cats

Defence
DT – Milt Graham, Ottawa Rough Riders
DT – John Barrow, Hamilton Tiger-Cats
DE – Pete Neumann, Hamilton Tiger-Cats
DE – Doug McNichol, Montreal Alouettes
DG – Vince Scott, Hamilton Tiger-Cats
DG – Jackie Simpson, Montreal Alouettes
LB – Tommy Hugo, Montreal Alouettes
LB – Tony Curcillo, Hamilton Tiger-Cats
DB – Hal Patterson, Montreal Alouettes
DB – Ralph Goldston, Hamilton Tiger-Cats
DB – Ed Macon, Hamilton Tiger-Cats
S  – Bobby Simpson, Ottawa Rough Riders

1958 Western All-Stars

Offence
QB – Jackie Parker, Edmonton Eskimos
RB – Cookie Gilchrist, Saskatchewan Roughriders
RB – Jack Hill, Saskatchewan Roughriders
RB – Leo Lewis, Winnipeg Blue Bombers
RB – Johnny Bright, Edmonton Eskimos
E  – Ken Carpenter, Saskatchewan Roughriders
E  – Ernie Warlick, Calgary Stampeders
C  – Jim Furey, Calgary Stampeders
OG – Harry Langford, Calgary Stampeders
OG – Tom Hinton, British Columbia Lions
OT – Don Luzzi, Calgary Stampeders
OT – Roger Nelson, Edmonton Eskimos

Defence
DT – Don Luzzi, Calgary Stampeders
DT – Buddy Tinsley, Winnipeg Blue Bombers
DE – Art Walker, Edmonton Eskimos
DE – Herb Gray, Winnipeg Blue Bombers
MG – Steve Patrick, Winnipeg Blue Bombers
LB – Rollie Miles, Edmonton Eskimos
LB – Gord Rowland, Winnipeg Blue Bombers
LB – David Burkholder, Winnipeg Blue Bombers
LB – Ted Tully, Edmonton Eskimos
DB – Jack Gotta, Calgary Stampeders
DB – Larry Isbell, Saskatchewan Roughriders
S  – Oscar Kruger, Edmonton Eskimos

1958 CFL Awards
 CFL's Most Outstanding Player Award: Jackie Parker (QB), Edmonton Eskimos
 CFL's Most Outstanding Canadian Award: Ron Howell (FW), Hamilton Tiger-Cats
 CFL's Most Outstanding Lineman Award: Don Luzzi (OT/DT), Calgary Stampeders
 Jeff Russel Memorial Trophy (IRFU MVP) – Sam Etcheverry (QB), Montreal Alouettes
 Jeff Nicklin Memorial Trophy (WIFU MVP) - Jackie Parker (QB), Edmonton Eskimos
 Gruen Trophy (IRFU Rookie of the Year) - Russ Jackson (QB), Ottawa Rough Riders
 Dr. Beattie Martin Trophy (WIFU Rookie of the Year) - Walt Radzick (DT), Calgary Stampeders
 DeMarco–Becket Memorial Trophy (WIFU Outstanding Lineman) - Don Luzzi (OT/DT), Calgary Stampeders

1958 Miss Grey Cup
Miss Montreal Alouettes Joan Van Boven was named Miss Grey Cup 1958

References

CFL
Canadian Football League seasons